The Cortemaggiore gas field natural gas field located in Cortemaggiore, Emilia-Romagna. It was discovered in 2000 and developed by Eni. It began production in 2000 and produces natural gas and condensates. The total proven reserves of the Cortemaggiore gas field are around 495 billion cubic feet (14.2km³), and production is slated to be around 105 million cubic feet/day (3×106m³).

References

Natural gas fields in Italy